The International Merchandising Mart Mall (usually referred to as IMM Mall) is an outlet mall owned by CapitaLand Mall Trust, located in Jurong East, Singapore. Besides retail stores, it also houses offices and warehouses for storage, which is advantageous in terms of cost efficiency to some retailers. The mall has capacity for 235 retail outlets and 430 non-retail outlets. Anchor tenants of the mall include Giant Hypermarket, Daiso department store, Popular Bookstore and Best Denki.

Renovation

In May 2012, IMM began a $30 million renovation project. The size of the building was increased and more stores were set up in the shopping centre.

Transport

Free Shuttle Bus Services 
There are free Shuttle Bus Services at International Business Park. The passenger will be transported between IMM and International Business Park and the operating hours is from 11.30am to 2pm, from Monday to Friday except Public Holidays.

References

CapitaLand
Shopping malls in Singapore
Jurong East